The Mathematics Subject Classification (MSC) is an alphanumerical classification scheme collaboratively produced by staff of, and based on the coverage of, the two major mathematical reviewing databases, Mathematical Reviews and Zentralblatt MATH. The MSC is used by many mathematics journals, which ask authors of research papers and expository articles to list subject codes from the Mathematics Subject Classification in their papers. The current version is MSC2020.

Structure 

The MSC is a hierarchical scheme, with three levels of structure. A classification can be two, three or five digits long, depending on how many levels of the classification scheme are used.

The first level is represented by a two-digit number, the second by a letter, and the third by another two-digit number. For example:

 53 is the classification for differential geometry
 53A is the classification for classical differential geometry
 53A45 is the classification for vector and tensor analysis

First level 
At the top level, 64 mathematical disciplines are labeled with a unique two-digit number. In addition to the typical areas of mathematical research, there are top-level categories for "History and Biography", "Mathematics Education", and for the overlap with different sciences. Physics (i.e. mathematical physics) is particularly well represented in the classification scheme with a number of different categories including:
 Fluid mechanics
 Quantum mechanics
 Geophysics
 Optics and electromagnetic theory

All valid MSC classification codes must have at least the first-level identifier.

Second level 

The second-level codes are a single letter from the Latin alphabet. These represent specific areas covered by the first-level discipline. The second-level codes vary from discipline to discipline.

For example, for differential geometry, the top-level code is 53, and the second-level codes are:
 A for classical differential geometry
 B for local differential geometry
 C for global differential geometry
 D for symplectic geometry and contact geometry

In addition, the special second-level code "-" is used for specific kinds of materials. These codes are of the form:

 53-00 General reference works (handbooks, dictionaries, bibliographies, etc.)
 53-01 Instructional exposition (textbooks, tutorial papers, etc.)
 53-02 Research exposition (monographs, survey articles)
 53-03 Historical (must also be assigned at least one classification number from Section 01)
 53-04 Explicit machine computation and programs (not the theory of computation or programming)
 53-06 Proceedings, conferences, collections, etc.

The second and third level of these codes are always the same - only the first level changes. For example, it is not valid to use 53- as a classification. Either 53 on its own or, better yet, a more specific code should be used.

Third level 

Third-level codes are the most specific, usually corresponding to a specific kind of mathematical object or a well-known problem or research area.

The third-level code 99 exists in every category and means none of the above, but in this section.

Using the scheme 

The AMS recommends that papers submitted to its journals for publication have one primary classification and one or more optional secondary classifications. A typical MSC subject class line on a research paper looks like

MSC Primary 03C90; Secondary 03-02;

History

According to the American Mathematical Society (AMS) help page about MSC, the MSC has been revised a number of times since 1940. Based on a scheme to organize AMS's Mathematical Offprint Service (MOS scheme), the AMS Classification was established for the classification of reviews in Mathematical Reviews in the 1960s. It saw various ad-hoc changes. Despite its shortcomings, Zentralblatt für Mathematik started to use it as well in the 1970s. In the late 1980s, a jointly revised scheme with more formal rules was agreed upon by Mathematical Reviews and Zentralblatt für Mathematik under the new name Mathematics Subject Classification. It saw various revisions as MSC1990, MSC2000 and MSC2010. In July 2016, Mathematical Reviews and zbMATH started collecting input from the mathematical community on the next revision of MSC, which was released as MSC2020 in January 2020. 

The original classification of older items has not been changed. This can sometimes make it difficult to search for older works dealing with particular topics. Changes at the first level involved the subjects with (present) codes 03, 08, 12-20, 28, 37, 51, 58, 74, 90, 91, 92.

Relation to other classification schemes 

For physics papers the Physics and Astronomy Classification Scheme (PACS) is often used. Due to the large overlap between mathematics and physics research it is quite common to see both PACS and MSC codes on research papers, particularly for multidisciplinary journals and repositories such as the arXiv.

The ACM Computing Classification System (CCS) is a similar hierarchical classification scheme for computer science. There is some overlap between the AMS and ACM classification schemes, in subjects related to both mathematics and computer science, however the two schemes differ in the details of their organization of those topics.

The classification scheme used on the arXiv is chosen to reflect the papers submitted. As arXiv is multidisciplinary its classification scheme does not fit entirely with the MSC, ACM or PACS classification schemes. It is common to see codes from one or more of these schemes on individual papers.

First-level areas
00: General (Includes topics such as recreational mathematics, philosophy of mathematics and mathematical modeling.)
01: History and biography
03: Mathematical logic and foundations (including model theory, computability theory, set theory, proof theory, and algebraic logic)
05: Combinatorics
06: Order, lattices, ordered algebraic structures
08: General algebraic systems
11: Number theory
12: Field theory and polynomials 
13: Commutative algebra (Commutative rings and algebras)
14: Algebraic geometry
15: Linear and multilinear algebra; matrix theory 
16: Associative rings and (associative) algebras
17: Non-associative rings and (non-associative) algebras
18: Category theory; homological algebra
19: -theory
20: Group theory and generalizations 
22: Topological groups, Lie groups (and analysis upon them)
26: Real functions (including derivatives and integrals)
28: Measure and integration
30: Functions of a complex variable (including approximation theory in the complex domain)
31: Potential theory 
32: Several complex variables and analytic spaces
33: Special functions
34: Ordinary differential equations 
35: Partial differential equations 
37: Dynamical systems and ergodic theory 
39: Difference (equations) and functional equations 
40: Sequences, series, summability 
41: Approximations and expansions
42: Harmonic analysis on Euclidean spaces (including Fourier analysis, Fourier transforms, trigonometric approximation, trigonometric interpolation, and orthogonal functions)
43: Abstract harmonic analysis 
44: Integral transforms, operational calculus 
45: Integral equations   
46: Functional analysis (including infinite-dimensional holomorphy, integral transforms in distribution spaces)
47: Operator theory 
49: Calculus of variations and optimal control; optimization (including geometric integration theory)
51: Geometry 
52: Convex (geometry) and discrete geometry
53: Differential geometry 
54: General topology 
55: Algebraic topology 
57: Manifolds and cell complexes
58: Global analysis, analysis on manifolds (including infinite-dimensional holomorphy)
60: Probability theory and stochastic processes
62: Statistics
65: Numerical analysis
68: Computer science
70: Mechanics of particles and systems (including particle mechanics)
74: Mechanics of deformable solids 
76: Fluid mechanics
78: Optics, electromagnetic theory 
80: Classical thermodynamics, heat transfer
81: Quantum theory
82: Statistical mechanics, structure of matter
83: Relativity and gravitational theory (including relativistic mechanics) 
85: Astronomy and astrophysics
86: Geophysics
90: Operations research, mathematical programming 
91: Game theory, economics, social and behavioral sciences
92: Biology and other natural sciences
93: Systems theory; control (including optimal control)
94: Information and communication, circuits
97: Mathematics education

See also

 Areas of mathematics
 Mathematical knowledge management
 MathSciNet

References

External links
MSC2020-Mathematical Sciences Classification System. PDF of MSC2020.
The Zentralblatt MATH page on the Mathematics Subject Classification. MSC2020 can be seen here.
Mathematics Subject Classification 2010 The site where the MSC2010 revision was carried out publicly in an MSCwiki. A view of the whole scheme and the changes made from MSC2000, as well as PDF files of the MSC and ancillary documents are there. A personal copy of the MSC in TiddlyWiki form can be had also.
The American Mathematical Society page on the Mathematics Subject Classification.

Fields of mathematics
Mathematical classification systems